Aland is a municipality in the district of Stendal, in Saxony-Anhalt, Germany. It was formed on 1 January 2010 by the merger of the former municipalities Aulosen, Krüden, Pollitz and Wanzer. On 1 September 2010 it absorbed the former municipality Wahrenberg. The municipality consists of the divisions (Ortsteile) Aulosen, Krüden, Pollitz, Scharpenhufe, Vielbaum, Wanzer and Wahrenberg.

References

 
Stendal (district)